, titled  during serialization, is a Japanese manga series written and illustrated by Yuki Mizuta. It was serialized in the digital manga magazine Boys Fan from June to December 2018. A live-action film adaptation was released in theaters on February 14, 2020.

Plot

Makoto Katsuragi is an elite office worker who has fallen from his perfect life with the sudden death of his parents, being forced to resign from his job, and his girlfriend leaving him. In a drunken stupor, he impulsively decides to commit suicide. Before he is able to jump off a building, he is rescued by a mysterious man named Ryūji Yoden, who demands he forfeit his life to him, forcing him into a life of confinement and sadomasochistic training. As Katsuragi experiences pain and pleasure that forces him to realize he's alive, he comes to fall in love with Yoden and reconsiders dying.

Media

Manga

Dangerous Drugs of Sex is written and illustrated by Yuki Mizuta. It is serialized in digital manga magazine Boys Fan from June 21, 2018 to December 20, 2018. The chapters were later released in one bound volume by Magazine Magazine under the Junet Comics Pierce Series imprint.

Film adaptation

The film was directed and written by Hideo Jojo. Jojo claimed that the film would be the first boys' love film with an R18 rating. The film was first screened on February 14, 2020 at Ikebukuro Cinema Rosa. After it was screened privately for two weeks, it was later released in Japanese theaters nationwide on March 6, 2020.

Dangerous Drugs of Sex premiered internationally at the Bucheon International Fantastic Film Festival on July 11 and July 14, 2020. It was also entered into the 2020 Taiwan International Queer Film Festival and Wicked Queer. The film later released on Netflix in Japan on July 14, 2020.

Reception

Dangerous Drugs of Sex sold 1 million digital copies by 2019.

Gay writer Mochigi reviewed the film adaptation favorably, claiming that it was enjoyable for audiences regardless of sexuality. He stated that aside from the film's erotic elements, it also portrayed depth towards the characters instead of reducing them to simply pornographic roles, citing the scenes of Katsuragi's social life. Kee Chang from Anthem stated the film "asked a lot of its audience."

References

External links
 

LGBT in anime and manga
Live-action films based on manga
Manga adapted into films
Yaoi anime and manga
2010s LGBT literature
BDSM literature
Japanese LGBT-related films
Japanese romantic drama films
LGBT-related romantic drama films
2020 LGBT-related films
2020 films